Ecuandureo is a municipality in the Mexican state of Michoacán. It is located in the northwestern part of the state and its head is the town of Ecuandureo.

See also
2015 Michoacán shootout

External links
 Ecuandureo municipality in PueblosAmerica.com

Municipalities of Michoacán